Rajoka is a village in Chiniot District.

Villages in Chiniot District